Pleasant Grove is an unincorporated community in Sutter County, California, United States. Pleasant Grove has a post office with ZIP code 95668.

History
The community originated as a wagon and freight stop, and was nicknamed "Gouge-Eye" after a saloon fight in which one man gouged out the eye of another.

References

Unincorporated communities in California
Unincorporated communities in Sutter County, California